Steve Borg (born 15 May 1988) is a Maltese professional footballer who currently plays as a defender for Maltese Premier League side Ħamrun Spartans and the Malta national football team.

Club career

Mosta
In 2005, he signed for local Maltese outfit Mosta. He played there until 2009.

Valletta and Aris Limassol
In 2009, he signed with Valletta. In six years he won three Maltese Premier League titles (2010–11, 2011–12, 2013–14) and two Maltese FA Cups (2009–10 and 2013–14).

After a short spell in Cyprus with Aris Limassol, he came back to Valletta in 2016, where he spent four more years, winning two more Maltese titles (2017–18 and 2018–19) and another Maltese Cup (2017–18).

Gzira United 
In 2020 he signed a five-year contract with the Maltese Premier League team Gżira United. In the same year he received the Maltese Player of the Year award for his performances with Valletta in the previous season.

Honours

Valletta
 Maltese Premier League: 2010–11, 2011–12, 2013–14, 2017–18, 2018–19
 Maltese Cup: 2009–10, 2013–14, 2017–18
 Maltese Super Cup: 2010, 2011, 2012, 2016, 2018

Individual
 Maltese Player of the Year: 2019–20

International career
In October 2011 he made his debut for the Malta national football team in UEFA Euro 2012 qualifying rounds against Latvia.

International goals
Scores and results list Malta's goal tally first.

References

1988 births
Living people
Maltese footballers
Maltese expatriate footballers
Malta international footballers
Mosta F.C. players
Valletta F.C. players
Aris Limassol FC players
Maltese Premier League players
Cypriot First Division players
Expatriate footballers in Cyprus
Maltese expatriate sportspeople in Cyprus
People from Mosta
Association football central defenders